Brian Sharples (born 6 September 1944) is an English former professional footballer born in Bradford who played as a centre half. He made 139 appearances in the Football League playing for Birmingham City and Exeter City.

References
 
 
 

1944 births
Living people
English footballers
Association football central defenders
Birmingham City F.C. players
Exeter City F.C. players
English Football League players
Footballers from Bradford